The kumuz or agach-kumuz is a stringed instrument used by the Kumyks of Dagestan, in the Russian Caucasus. It has three strings and is fretted. Scholars have noticed the similarity in name to the Kyrgyz komuz, but note the kumuz is perhaps more closely related to the other lutes of the Caucasus.

Legendarily, the Kumyk poet Irchi Kozak cured the sick with the music of his agach-kumuz.

References

See also
Chonguri, Georgian fretless lute
Panduri, Georgian fretted lute

Dagestanian musical instruments
String instruments